The Korea District Heating Corporation (KDHC) is a South Korean district heating company with its main office in Seongnam, South Korea. It was established as a statutory corporation in 1985 "for the purpose of dealing effectively with the United Nations Framework Convention on Climate Change by promoting energy conservation and improving living standards through the efficient use of district heating". It supplied district heating services to 1.3 million South Korean households as of 2015.

References 

1985 establishments in South Korea
District heating